Non-Stop is a 2014 action thriller film directed by Jaume Collet-Serra, co-produced by Joel Silver, and starring Liam Neeson and Julianne Moore. It follows an alcoholic ex-NYPD officer turned Federal Air Marshal who must find a killer on an international flight, from New York to London, after receiving texts saying someone on board will be executed every 20 minutes until financial demands are met. The film marks the second collaboration between Collet-Serra and Neeson after Unknown.

An international co-production among France, the United States, the United Kingdom and Canada, it was the first film from Silver Pictures to be distributed by Universal Pictures since the end of Silver's deal with Warner Bros. Released in the United States on February 28, 2014, the film received generally mixed reviews from critics but was a box-office success, grossing $222 million against its $50 million budget.

Plot

U.S. Air Marshal and ex-NYPD officer Bill Marks boards a transatlantic, long-haul flight from New York City to London. Marks sits next to Jen Summers, in business class, who has switched seats so she can sit by the window. After takeoff, Marks receives a text message on his secure phone stating that someone will die every 20 minutes unless $150 million is transferred to a specified bank account. Marks breaks protocol and consults the flight's other air marshal Jack Hammond, who dismisses the threat. Marks has Summers and flight attendant Nancy monitor the security cameras while texting the mysterious person to try to identify him.

When Marks catches Hammond on his phone nearing the 20-minute mark, he confronts him again. This time, Hammond tries to bribe Marks, confirming his suspicions. Hammond attacks, forcing Marks to kill him exactly at the 20-minute mark. Marks finds cocaine in his briefcase and learns the perpetrator had blackmailed him and set him up for death. He alerts the TSA, but TSA Agent Marenick informs him that the bank account is registered in his name and accuses Marks of being the perpetrator. Captain David McMillan dies, apparently poisoned. First Officer Kyle Rice, the co-pilot, convinces Marks that he is innocent.

Marks searches the resentful passengers. One of them uploads a video in which Marks accuses and manhandles schoolteacher Tom Bowen, convincing the rest of the world that Marks is the perpetrator. Kyle is instructed by the TSA to divert to Iceland. Marks persuades programmer Zack White to write a computer virus to make the hijacker's phone ring. The phone rings in passenger Charles Wheeler's suit pocket, but he denies it is his. As Marks roughly questions him, Wheeler suddenly dies, foaming at the mouth. In the first-class lavatory, Marks discovers a hole drilled into the wall that offers a clear shot to the pilot's seat, and discovers a dart in Wheeler's body. A passenger tells him Summers entered the lavatory recently. Marks accuses Summers of being the hijacker. Summers becomes upset, as she had stood by him, and convinces him of her innocence.

Two RAF Typhoon fighter jets meet the plane to escort it to a military base in Iceland. Summers and Marks unlock the hijacker's phone, unintentionally starting a 30-minute timer for a bomb. Through words in a television news report claiming that Marks is hijacking their flight, Marks realizes that the bomb bypassed the security checks, and finds it in Hammond's cocaine briefcase. When some passengers attack Marks, Bowen stops them, believing that the bomb is the priority. Marks convinces the others of his innocence and has them move the bomb to the rear and surround it with luggage to direct the blast outward, while everybody moves to the front of the airplane. Marks tells Kyle to follow explosive protocol and descend to 8,000 feet, from a cruising altitude of 30,000 feet and speed of 500 mph, as the current pressure differential will destroy the airplane if the bomb explodes, although the escorting jets refuse to let Kyle deviate from his course. Watching the earlier video, Marks notices Bowen planting the phone on Wheeler, implicating Bowen as the mastermind of the murders. White reveals himself as Bowen's accomplice.

Bowen reveals that his father was killed in the September 11 attacks and blames the U.S. for not improving their security enough to prevent future similar attacks. Their goal was to frame Marks as a terrorist, thus ruining the reputation of the Air Marshals Service to force the U.S. to create stronger security laws. Marks persuades White, who was in it for the money, to try to disarm the bomb. Bowen, who wishes to die on the plane in a suicide mission, shoots White to stop him, rendering him unconscious. Kyle gets the plane down to 8,000 feet, giving Marks the opportunity to kill Bowen. White regains consciousness and attacks Marks, still wanting to escape the aircraft, but the bomb detonates, killing him and blowing open the back of the plane. Despite the damage, Rice barely lands the plane in Iceland, with no loss of life. Marks is praised as a hero and exonerated. It is implied that he and Summers might begin a relationship.

Cast

Production

Filming
Filming began on November 1, 2012, at York Studios in Maspeth, Queens, New York City, then continued at JFK Airport on December 7, 2012, and at Long Island MacArthur Airport. This was the inaugural movie filmed at York Studios.

Music

The original motion picture soundtrack was composed by John Ottman. The record was released on April 3, 2014, via Varèse Sarabande label.

Release

Home media
Non-Stop was released on Blu-ray Disc and DVD on June 10, 2014.

Reception

Box office
The film opened in 3,090 theaters in the United States and Canada, making $10 million on opening day. It went on to debut to $28.8 million, finishing first ahead of former box-office leader The Lego Movie, which also starred Neeson, and fellow new release Son of God. In its second weekend the film dropped 45%, grossing $15.8 million and finishing third.

The film earned $92.1 million in North America and $130.6 million in other territories for a total gross of $222.8 million, against a budget of $50 million.

Critical response
On Rotten Tomatoes, the film has an approval rating of 62% based on 229 reviews, with an average score of 5.80/10. The website's critical consensus reads: "While Liam Neeson is undoubtedly an asset, Non-Stop wastes its cast — not to mention its solid premise and tense setup—on a poorly conceived story that hinges on a thoroughly unbelievable final act." On another aggregation website, Metacritic, it holds a weighted average score of 56 out of 100, based on 41 critics, indicating "mixed or average reviews". Audiences polled by CinemaScore gave the film an average grade of "A−" on an A+ to F scale.

Chris Nashawaty, writing for Entertainment Weekly, delivered a positive review, grading it "B", and observing: "At a certain point either you'll fasten your seat belt and go with Non-Stop'''s absurd, Looney Tunes logic or you won't. Against my better judgment, I went with it. After all, Neeson has shown time and again that he's the closest thing Hollywood has these days to a box office Rumpelstiltskin. He can spin cheese into gold." David Denby, for The New Yorker, was ambivalent on the film's overall scope, but praised Neeson, writing, "Neeson, who brings enormous conviction to these late-career action roles, moves his big body through confined spaces (virtually the entire movie takes place in the airplane) with so much power that you expect him to rip out the seats."

Richard Corliss, for Time, had a blasé opinion, stating that the film "is no more or less than what it intends to be.." and posits the question: "Why demand logic of an action movie released in February, when audiences just want a nice, bumpy ride?" Susan Wloszczyna of RogerEbert.com wrote, "Liam Neeson is not going to be knocked off his perch as the elder statesman of B-movie tough guys any time soon...", and continued, "The rather ingenious if preposterous premise, one that only goes way off course in the heavy-handed third act...'Non-Stop' is so ridiculously entertaining in spite of its occasional lapses in real-world logic." Tom Shone, reviewing for The Guardian, maintained a similar tone in his review, saying of Neeson: "He's at his best striding up and down the aisles of the aircraft with that big, rolling gait of his, carving out great wads of air with his hands, barking orders, his face in Rodin-ish profile, his destiny, like Mitchum's, enlivened by a nobility far greater than the film he finds himself in – the true sign of a B-movie king"; and of Moore: "...Neeson enjoys a nice, relaxed rapport with Moore, whose looser, Keaton-esque side seems to come out when cast opposite noble hunks."

Possible sequel
On June 11, 2014, Entertainment Weekly'' reported that in an interview with producer Joel Silver, he talked about the possibility of a sequel, and stated that it will not be happening on a plane again. "I need to think of a way to put them in an equal situation. But when I make a sequel I like to replicate the experience, not replicate the movie. I'm not going to put them on a plane again, of course. He has a touch of Sherlock Holmes in that he has to figure out what's going on and then he has to figure out how to solve it. I think that character's a great character and we'll try to figure something else to do. I haven't thought about it yet. But I have to, sooner or later."

References

External links
 
 
 
 
 

2014 action thriller films
2010s disaster films
2010s mystery thriller films
2014 films
Aftermath of the September 11 attacks
American action thriller films
American aviation films
American disaster films
American mystery thriller films
English-language French films
Films scored by John Ottman
Films about aviation accidents or incidents
Films about aircraft hijackings
French films about revenge
Films about terrorism in the United States
Films about terrorism in Europe
Films directed by Jaume Collet-Serra
Films set in 2014
Films set in Iceland
Films set in New York City
Films set in Washington, D.C.
Films set on airplanes
Films shot in New York City
Films produced by Joel Silver
French action thriller films
French disaster films
French mystery thriller films
British action thriller films
British aviation films
British disaster films
British mystery thriller films
Canadian action thriller films
Canadian aviation films
Canadian disaster films
Canadian mystery thriller films
Silver Pictures films
StudioCanal films
Universal Pictures films
2010s English-language films
2010s American films
2010s Canadian films
2010s British films
2010s French films